The war memorial in Douglas, Isle of Man is dedicated to those who died during World War I and World War II. The rolls of names are segregated by service and year of death.

The inscriptions on the memorial read:
 Douglas commemorates the loyalty, courage, and self sacrifice of those who fell in the Great Wars 1914 - 1918, 1939 - 1945
 These are they who for their country & freedoms / sake loved not their lives unto the death / therefore they shall be as the stones of a crown / lifted up as an ensign upon this land (over four sides of the memorial separated by /)

Design

It was designed to have a flower garden and guard rail surrounding it and stands on what was once a bandstand area. The front facade features sculptures of a wreath and holy cross. Rolls of names and copper vases for flowers are affixed to the base.

The monument was designed by Ewart Crellin (1887–1950) who also designed the Lezayre War Memorial while sculptures were carved by Harry Hems & Co. of Exeter who also carved the St. Matthews War Memorial. The design was unveiled to the public in 1922. The monument was erected in May 1924.

The monument was dedicated only to the fallen members of World War I due to the date of its design and introduction. Names of fallen World War II members were later incorporated into the statue.

Location
The memorial is located along Harris Promenade, across from the Villa Marina, in Douglas, Isle of Man.

References

Monuments and memorials in the Isle of Man
British military memorials and cemeteries
Buildings and structures completed in 1924
Douglas, Isle of Man